Yu Liyan (born 1 June 2000) is a Chinese swimmer. She competed in the women's 200 metre butterfly at the 2020 Summer Olympics held in Tokyo, Japan.

In 2018, she represented China at the 2018 Asian Games held in Jakarta, Indonesia. She competed in the women's 200 metre butterfly event.

References

External links
 

2000 births
Living people
Chinese female butterfly swimmers
Olympic swimmers of China
Swimmers at the 2020 Summer Olympics
Sportspeople from Shenzhen
Asian Games competitors for China
Swimmers at the 2018 Asian Games
21st-century Chinese women